The Lake Ivanhoe Historic Residential District is a U.S. historic district located around Lake Ivanhoe in Orlando, Florida. The district is roughly bounded by Orlando Street, Interstate 4, Lakeview Street, Edgewater Drive.

It was added to the National Register of Historic Places on December 20, 2010.

References

National Register of Historic Places in Orange County, Florida
Historic districts on the National Register of Historic Places in Florida
Geography of Orlando, Florida